Gyula Alberty Kiszel (24 April 1903 – 13 November 1950) was a Hungarian footballer who played as a goalkeeper for Real Madrid. He is best known for being the first foreign professional footballer to debut with the Madrid club's shirt.

Club career
Born in Debrecen, Hungary, Alberty Kiszel started out as a goalkeeper for Boksai Sport Club in his hometown, but in 1934, at the age of twenty-three, Real Madrid brought him to Spain, thus becoming the first foreign professional footballer to debut with the white's shirt. He arrived at Real Madrid to take over from another legendary goalkeeper, Ricardo Zamora, already at the end of his active career. He played two seasons for the Madrid team for a total of twenty league games. He also helped the club win the Copa del Rey twice, in 1934 and 1936. He delighted locals and strangers with his style, making impossible interventions under the goal and getting out of his frame with great confidence and courage.

After the outbreak of the Spanish Civil War, he signed for the French side Le Havre, where he played two seasons (1936–37 and 1937–38). When the war ended, he returned to Spain where he had a brief stint at Real Unión, where he spent a few months before joining Racing Club de Ferrol, a club with which he came to play the final of the 1939 Copa del Generalísimo against Sevilla FC, in which he conceded 6 goals in a 2–6 loss, including a hat-trick from Campanal I.

In the summer of 1939, he signed for Celta de Vigo, where he played for two seasons. In his first year in Vigo, Alberty's great performances helped Celta stay in the top flight, and in his second season he once again played a crucial role to save Celta from relegation. Alberty adapted to Vigo with ease, so much indeed, that in 1941, after leaving the club, he set up a cafeteria business on Calle Colón, called the Bar Club, where Celta's offices would later be located. In 1941, he was transferred to Granada CF, recently promoted to the Spanish top flight. He quickly captivated the fans with his stops and curious customs such as eating oranges during games or squeezing them to drink their juice.

In the spring of 1942, Alberty fell ill. He started having stomach pains and had to have surgery. He was forced to retire due to his illness, typhoid fever, which was the cause of his death just a month later, on 9 April 1942, at the age of thirty, in the Purísima sanatorium, accompanied by family members and Paco Bru. Some sources suggest that the cause of his premature death could have been an injury caused by Sevilla's Campanal tackles in a previous match.

Honours
Real Madrid
Centro Regional Championship:
Winners (1): 1935–36
Copa del Rey:
Winners (2): 1934 and 1936

Racing de Ferrol
Copa del Rey:
Runner-up (1): 1939

References

1911 births
1942 deaths
Hungarian footballers
Association football goalkeepers
Real Madrid CF players
Granada CF footballers
RC Celta de Vigo players
La Liga players